Heteropsyche stenomorpha is a moth in the family Epipyropidae. It is found in Australia.

The wingspan is about 8 mm. The forewings are black or blackish fuscous and rather roughly scaled. The hindwings are like the forewings, but more finely scaled.

The larvae feed on planthoppers of the superfamily Fulgoroidea.

References

Moths described in 1905
Epipyropidae
Taxa named by Robert Cyril Layton Perkins